Skeena—Bulkley Valley is a federal electoral district in British Columbia, Canada, that has been represented in the House of Commons of Canada since 2004.

Geography
This is a mostly wilderness area comprising almost the entire northwestern quarter of British Columbia, including the islands of  Haida Gwaii and the large region inland from the Alaska Panhandle.

This district includes the cities of Terrace and Prince Rupert, the town of Smithers, as well as the districts of Kitimat, Hazelton, New Hazelton, Stewart, Port Edward, Houston and the villages of Masset, Burns Lake, Granisle, Telkwa and Port Clements.

Demographics

History
This electoral district was created in 2003 from Skeena, some of Prince George—Bulkley Valley and a small part of Cariboo—Chilcotin riding.

The 2012 federal electoral boundaries redistribution concluded that the electoral boundaries of Skeena—Bulkley Valley should be adjusted slightly, and a modified electoral district of the same name has been contested in elections thereafter. The redefined Skeena—Bulkley Valley gained a small portion of territory in the upper Bella Coola Valley from the district of Cariboo—Prince George but was otherwise unchanged. These new boundaries were legally defined in the 2013 representation order, which came come into effect upon the call of the 2015 election.

Member of Parliament

This riding has elected the following Member of Parliament:

Current Member of Parliament
Its Member of Parliament is Taylor Bachrach, who was formerly the mayor of Smithers, British Columbia.

Election results

See also
 List of Canadian federal electoral districts
 Past Canadian electoral districts

References

 Library of Parliament Riding Profile
 Expenditures - 2004

Notes

External links
 Website of the Parliament of Canada

British Columbia federal electoral districts
Prince Rupert, British Columbia
Smithers, British Columbia
Terrace, British Columbia